Balkania was the name of a proposed state in the Balkans, suggested by the Kosovo Albanian politician Adem Demaçi in 1993. Intended as an alternative to Serb-Albanian ethnic conflict, it would have transformed the rump third Yugoslavia into a democratic confederation consisting of Serbia, Kosovo, and Montenegro.

The proposal became moot when Montenegro declared independence in 2006, and after still disputed Kosovo declared independence in 2008.

A confederation with the name "Balkania" was also proposed by the Romanian historian Victor Papacostea in 1936 to solve regional conflicts under Romanian leadership.

Notes and references
References:

1990s in Kosovo
1993 in Albania
1993 in Serbia
1993 in Montenegro
Proposed countries
Albania–Serbia relations
Albania–Kosovo relations
Albania–Montenegro relations
Kosovo–Montenegro relations
Kosovo–Serbia relations
Montenegro–Serbia relations